The Zelenaluzhskaya line is the third line of the Minsk Metro. The line opened in 2020. It comprises 4 stations. The line was officially opened by Alexander Lukashenko and other officials on November 6, 2020.

When the line is completed, it will have 14 stations in total. It is to connect the northern and southern areas of Minsk with its center.

References

Minsk Metro
Railway lines opened in 2020